Legendary Grape is an album by Moby Grape, released by Dig Music in 2003.

History
The original album was issued in 1989 as a five hundred copy, cassette-only release on Herman Records. The album was at the time credited to The Melvilles, being one of the names used by Moby Grape during the course of their protracted dispute with former manager Matthew Katz over ownership of the band name and related royalties. The tapes were remastered by Dig Music, and eight additional songs were added for the release of Legendary Grape.

The album was recorded by original Moby Grape members Peter Lewis, Jerry Miller, Bob Mosley and Don Stevenson. All group members contributed songs, as had been the case during all of the band's history. However, whereas in the past Jerry Miller and Don Stevenson had generally written together, including some of Moby Grape's best known songs, both were now writing exclusively separately. Founding member Skip Spence was not well enough to perform, though one of his songs was included on the recording. It was the practice of Spence's bandmates to try to include at least one of his songs on every Moby Grape recording, irrespective of Spence's ability to participate in the recording.

Shortly after the album's original release, Bob Mosley, who was subject to the challenges of schizophrenia, as was Spence, commenced a period of homelessness that lasted approximately five years, until recovering through the assistance of bandmate Peter Lewis, among others.

Track listing

 "All My Life" (Skip Spence) 3:36
 "Nighttime Rider" (Bob Mosley) 3:07
 "Give It Hell" (Jerry Miller) 2:55
 "On The Dime" (Miller) 3:50
 "Lady of the Night" (Miller) 3:42
 "Changing" (Peter Lewis) 3:05
 "Took It All Away" (Mosley) 3:06
 "Bitter Wind in Tanganika" (Mosley) 3:33
 "Talk About Love (I'm Talking About You)" (Chuck Berry) 1:57
 "You'll Never Know" (Miller) 4:15
 "You Can Depend on Me" (Mosley) 3:09
 "Further On Up the Road" (Don Robey, Joe Veasey) 3:01
 "It Don't Take Much" (Mosley) 3:20
 "Gettin' Used to Being Treated Wrong" (Don Stevenson) 2:33
 "Forty Feet Tall" (Miller) 4:47
 "Forbidden Love" (Stevenson) 2:58
 "Telephone Love" (Mosley) 2:33
 "Rodeo" (Pettigrew) 4:14

Personnel
 Peter Lewis – rhythm guitar, vocals
 Jerry Miller – lead guitar, vocals
 Bob Mosley - bass, vocals
 Don Stevenson – drums, vocals

Additional personnel
 Dan Abernathy - rhythm guitar

Other Credits

 Mindy Giles - Associate Producer
 Dennis Newhall - Reissue Producer
 Don Stevenson - Engineer
 Robert Farrell - Mastering
 Martin de Anda - Artwork, Graphic Design, Design
 David Fricke - Liner Notes

References

Moby Grape albums
1989 greatest hits albums